The Icelandic men's national handball team represents Iceland in international men's handball. It is controlled by the Icelandic Handball Association.

Honours

Competitive record
 Champions   Runners-up   Third place   Fourth place

Olympic Games

World Championship

European Championship

Team

Current squad
Squad for the 2023 World Men's Handball Championship.

Head coach: Guðmundur Guðmundsson

Past squads
2008 Olympic Games (2nd place)
All Star Team: Guðjón Valur Sigurðsson (left wing), Snorri Guðjónsson (centre back), Ólafur Stefánsson (right back)
Björgvin Páll Gústavsson, Logi Geirsson, Bjarni Fritzson, Sigfús Sigurðsson, Ásgeir Örn Hallgrímsson, Arnór Atlason, Guðjón Valur Sigurðsson, Snorri Guðjónsson, Ólafur Stefánsson, Sturla Ásgeirsson, Alexander Petersson, Hreiðar Guðmundsson, Sverre Andreas Jakobsson, Róbert Gunnarsson, Ingimundur Ingimundarson.
Coach: Guðmundur Guðmundsson

2010 European Championship (3rd place)
All Star Team: Ólafur Stefánsson (right back)
Björgvin Páll Gústavsson, Hreiðar Guðmundsson, Vignir Svavarsson, Logi Geirsson, Ásgeir Örn Hallgrímsson, Arnór Atlason, Guðjón Valur Sigurðsson, Snorri Guðjónsson, Ólafur Stefánsson, Alexander Petersson, Sverre Andreas Jakobsson, Róbert Gunnarsson, Ingimundur Ingimundarson, Sturla Ásgeirsson, Þórir Ólafsson, Aron Pálmarsson, Ólafur Guðmundsson, Rúnar Kárason.
Coach: Guðmundur Guðmundsson

List of coaches

List of captains

Individual all-time records

Most matches played

 

Last updated: 6 March 2023Source: Icelandic Handball Association (hsi.is) Total number of matches played in official competitions only.

Most goals scored
 

Last updated: 26 January 2021Source: Icelandic Handball Association (hsi.is) Total number of goals scored in official matches only.

Record against Nordic countries
All games, including European Championships, World Championships and Olympic Games.

Last updated: 2 January 2016Source: Icelandic Handball Association (hsi.is)

Kit suppliers
Since 2006, Iceland's kits have been supplied by Kempa.

Following their silver medal at the 2008 Beijing Olympic Games, the penises of the team were cast in a silvery material and are on display at the Icelandic Phallological Museum.

References

External links

IHF profile

Handball
Men's national handball teams